Coba Höyük, also known as Sakçe Gözü or Sakçagözü, is an archaeological site in southeastern Anatolia. It is located about three kilometres north-west of the modern village of Sakçagözü. The site was occupied in the Pottery Neolithic, Halaf, Ubaid, Late Chalcolithic/Uruk and Neo-Hittite periods.

History

The site appears to have been occupied on and off from the second half of the seventh millennium BC until the first millennium BC. The excavations were small scale and an exact stratigraphical sequence cannot reliably be constructed.

In the first millennium BC the site was part of a Neo-Hittite state, the name of the city is not known. City walls and a palace of the bit-hilani type were found at the site and date to around 730-700 B.C.

Archaeology

The site was first discovered in 1883 by Karl Humann and Felix von Luschan. John Garstang was the first excavator in 1908 and 1911.  He was interested in the Hittite material on the surface of the site and discovered the portico of a Hittite palace (a bit hilani), now in Ankara, as well as the earliest excavated Halaf period material culture.

The site was re-excavated in 1949 by a team led by John d'Arcy Waechter, after the removal of the portico by the Turkish authorities in 1939 at the outbreak of the Second World War clearing the surface of the mound.

Objects excavated at Sakçagözü can be found at museums such as the Vorderasiatisches Museum in Berlin, the Museum of Anatolian Civilizations in Ankara, and the Istanbul Museum of Ancient Oriental Works. "Coba bowls" were named after their first description from the excavations at Coba Höyük.

See also
Tilmen Hoyuk

Notes

External links
 Reliefs from Sakçagözü on the "Hittite monuments" website.
 Coba Höyük's page on the TAY project

References
du Plat Taylor, J., Seton Williams, M. V., and Waechter, J. 1950. "The Excavations at Sakce Gözü" Iraq. Vol. 12, no. 2. pp. 53–138.

Aramean cities
Syro-Hittite states
Former populated places in Turkey
Archaeological sites in Southeastern Anatolia
Halaf culture
Late Neolithic